Francesco Ferrari may refer to:

 Francesco Ferrari (bishop) (died 1507), Italian Roman Catholic bishop 
 Francesco Ferrari (footballer) (born 1998), Italian football player
 Francesco Ferrari (painter) (1634–1708), Italian painter and architect
 Francesco Ferrari (politician, born 1905) (1905–1975), Italian politician
 Francesco Ferrari (politician, born 1946), Italian politician
 Francesco Ferrari (water polo), participated for Italy at the 2005 Mediterranean Games